Hanoi Football Club (HNFC) is a Vietnamese professional football club based in Hanoi, Vietnam that currently competes in the V.League 1.

Hanoi FC was founded in 2006 as T&T Hanoi Football Club, shortened as Hanoi T&T before renamed to Hanoi T&T Football Club in 2010 and finally to its current name in 2016. The club has participated in the V.League 1 since the 2009 season. The club has been regarded as the first fully professionalized club in the country and the most successful club in Vietnamese football with 6 V.League 1 title, 3 Vietnamese Cup and 5 Vietnamese Super Cup.

Hanoi's traditional colours is purple-white or purple-yellow home strip. The club's main rivals are Haiphong, against whom they contest the Northern Vietnam Derby. They also contest Hanoi Derby with Viettel and with Hanoi Police.

History

Foundation and rise
Hanoi FC was established in 2006 by T&T Group, a partly private business company that was seeking its fortune to raise the status. T&T hoped that by establishing the club, it would improve the company's profits to become a major company while on the same time also sought to bring the first sense of professional football to replace the current semi-professional status of Vietnamese football. Eventually, the club was officially established with support from local authorities as Hanoi T&T, and began in the lowest division of Vietnamese football, V.League 4.

The first three years in its existence, from a team of mostly young players led by coach Trieu Quang Ha (former player of the 
Vietnamese football team and The Cong) led, the team has been promoted to three consecutive places, from V.League 4 in 2006, finished in 1st place to V.League 3 in 2007, finshed in 2nd place, and finally to V.League 2 in 2008, finshed in 2nd place and winning the right to compete in V-League 2009.

First V.League title and establishment of a new powerhouse
Once the club established its foothold, Hanoi T&T began to emerge radically and started to feel success in its debut on the top league. The club missed out their chance to win the 2009 season, but soon got the joy when they won the 2010 season, the club's first ever title. 

Thanked for good management and domestic trophy in 2010, Hanoi T&T was able to participate in their first international tournament, the 2011 AFC Cup.
However, Hanoi T&T had performed poorly in their first AFC Cup tournament, finishing in third place in Group G.

In the 2012 season, Hanoi T&T won the second place. There have been many rumours said that Hanoi T&T have played defense throughout the enitre last match against Xuan Thanh Saigon to help SHB Da Nang won the tiltle, the club that also being owned by the same person who owned Hanoi T&T, despite they still have a chance to win the league. After this match, owner of Xuan Thanh Saigon have announced to dissolved the team.

The 2013 season was the season in which Hanoi T&T was crowned champion before a round after a 2-1 victory over Dong Tam Long An. This is also the season that the striker Gonzalo and Samson have played excellently with a total of 28 goals, thereby winning the title of top scorer together.

The season 2014 and 2015 marked the rise of Becamex Binh Duong, this is also the period marking the generation of the team when Duy Manh, Van Thanh, Minh Long were promoted to the first team together. With the departure of goalkeeper Le Van Nghia, midfielder Sy Cuong... In the 2014 AFC Cup, the team finished 1st place on Group F, defeated Nay Pyi Taw 5-0 in the Round of 16 but lost to Erbil of Iraq in the quarter-finals 3-0 on aggerate.

The 2016 season witnessed many fluctuations of Hanoi T&T when they changing coaches twice. The first time was just a week before the season when coach Phan Thanh Hung resigned and the coach of the Hanoi U21 T&T team at that time, Mr. Pham Minh Duc, was selected to replace him. However, after coach Pham Minh Duc started the season with extremely disappointing results when he only won 1 point after the first 4 matches and ranked at the bottom of the table. On March 17, 2016, the purple shirt team decided to bring assistant Chu Dinh Nghiem to take over Hanoi T&T replaced Pham Minh Duc. This change helped the team completely improve the gameplay and the results improved significantly and brought the team gradually to the top of the table when the tournament only had 2 rounds left. In the penultimate round and was forced to win to raise hopes of the championship, Hanoi T&T played bravely to win all 3 points against Than Quang Ninh with Nguyen Van Quyet's only goal to hold the right to self-determination before the match. last. A 2-0 victory over FLC Thanh Hoa thanks to Gonzalo's double in the final round helped Hanoi T&T lift the V-League championship for the third time when it was equal on points and just above Hai Phong in the sub-index. However, in the 2016 Vietnamese Cup, the purple shirt team only won the runner-up position after losing unfortunately to Than Quang Ninh at Hang Day Stadium with a score of 1-2.

Name change
In 2016, shortly after winning the 2016 season, T&T Group decided to dedicate the club to the people of Hanoi, thus retreating its stakeholder and the club was officially renamed as Hanoi FC. The City Council had also decided to grant Hàng Đẫy Stadium to the club as a tribute so the club could use and improve the facilities.

The 2017 season ended disappointingly for the purple team when they only finished in 3rd place in the despite holding a huge advantage when they won at least 1-0 against QNK Quang Nam (the team that won the championship later) in the penultimate round but drew 4-4 against Than Quang Ninh in the final round. In the 2017 Vietnamese Cup , the purple shirt team was disappointed when they were eliminated from the round of 16 by Song Lam Nghe An and were eliminated from the group stage of 2017 AFC Cup after the previous 6-2 loss against Ceres-Negros of the Philippines.

In the 2018 season, thanks to the strong effect from the success of the U23 Vietnam team in the 2018 AFC U-23 Championship with the core of purple shirt team players spanning all 3 lines, the capital's audience has gradually become interested in the team. The team started with a hard-fought 1-0 victory over Haiphong at Hang Day's home ground and then won 5-0 over Hoang Anh Gia Lai in a match where Hang Day reached its audience limit of 25,000. The purple team then crossed the finish line and were crowned champions before 5 rounds with 64 points and 72 goals scored. However, the 2018 season ended incompletely when the purple team missed the appointment with the 2018 Vietnamese Cup when Becamex Binh Duong drew 0-0 at Go Dau (total score 3-3 and the purple team was eliminated). due to away goals rule).

The purple shirt team started the season with a 1-0 victory at the 2019 AFC Champions League play-off match. The purple shirt team's domestic season started with a 2-0 victory over Becamex Binh Duong in the Super Cup match. Nation . However, in the play-off round 2, when faced with a much different team from China,Shandong Luneng, the purple shirt team suffered a 4-1 defeat despite having a goal. took the lead and had a superior match against the opponent, this defeat forced the purple shirt team to play in the 2019 AFC Cup. The purple team started the 2019 with a crisp 5-0 victory over Than Quang Ninh in the first round . However, the purple shirt team had a much more difficult championship race than 2018 season when having to compete in parallel on 3 different fronts, namely V.League 1,Vietnamese Cup and AFC Cup, especially the rise of the new power in Ho Chi Minh City.The team continuously dropped scores in the last minutes against underdogs like Hoang Anh Gia Lai,Sanna Khanh Hoa BVN or even before the direct competitor for the championship, Ho Chi Minh City. But the spectacular acceleration in the following rounds helped the team to break through and win in round 24 against Song Lam Nghe An at Vinh Stadium to be crowned champions 2 rounds early. At the 2019 AFC Cup, the team passed the group stage with the first place in Group F and then surpassed Ceres Negros,Becamex Binh Duong,Altyn Asyr in turn and was bitterly eliminated before 4.25 SC because of the away goal rule. With 5 championships in the V.League arena, the purple shirt team has become the team that won the most V.League since the national championship officially went into professionalization in the 2000-2001 season. At the 2019 Vietnamese Cup arena, the purple team beat Hong Linh Ha Tinh,Duoc Nam Ha Nam Dinh in turn and won 3-0 convincingly against the phenomenon of Ho Chi Minh City. In the final match, despite having to play away from home and in bad weather conditions due to the influence of Storm No. 5, with the bravery and class of the big team and the timely shine of the stars, they have won the 2019 Vietnamese Cup, thereby adding the only title missing after many missed appointments.

In 2022, under the management of Chun Jae-ho, Hanoi FC have won the 2022 V.League 1 and the 2022 Vietnamese Cup.

In 2023 season, under Montenegro head coach Bozidar Bandovic they have won the 2023 Vietnamese Super Cup after defeated Haiphong 2-0.

Kit suppliers and shirt sponsors

Stadium

The team plays at the Hàng Đẫy Stadium in Hanoi, which was handled to the club in 2016 as a gesture for the club's professionalism and success. During the visit of the Communist Party of Vietnam's general secretary Nguyễn Phú Trọng in France in 2018, he and the French President Emmanuel Macron signed plenty of cooperation deals, including the rebuild and renovation of the stadium. The new stadium will cost €250 million and will be designed and built by the French company Bouygues.

Supporters

The club has a quite moderate, if not to say, low number of supporters despite its prestigious achievements, a legacy of previous corruption in V.League as many people lost interests to attend the league watching their clubs. In order to change the image, in 2015, a group of fans decided to found the first fan base for the club, known as Contras Hanoi. After early difficulties and conflict with old fans, Contras Hanoi has had over 2,000 members as for 2018 and has been expanding since, while also fought to gain official recognition with club's support. Professionalism is also a notable factor on the improvement of fan base and spreading of professional values.

Academy
Hanoi FC, in addition to their rising football success, also has a network system of youth football academies to feed the club, which is a major difference from the other major football clubs as Hanoi FC doesn't have a centralized youth academy. The youth team is trained in Hanoi FC's academies either in Gia Lâm or Cửa Lò, the latter shares academy with Song Lam Nghe An FC.

Rivalries

Haiphong

In terms of geographical factors, Hanoi and Hai Phong are the two largest cities in the North Vietnam, their people also have conflicts unrelated to football. Both clubs are also the two of the most successful clubs in the North, the confrontation with Hai Phong is therefore also known as the "Northern Derby".
The Portland is one of the opponents who always cause difficulties when encountering The Purple with an unpleasant play, the confrontation between the two teams is always fierce on the field, the rivalry of the fans. The culmination was the 2016 V-League season when Hanoi won the championship thanks to the difference in difference compared to the fiercely competitive team at that time, Hai Phong. In addition, the matches are "literally" hot, with flares being the specialty of the Port team every time they have to be guests at Hang Day Stadium. In the 2017 season, Hai Phong club was disciplined to play at home without an audience when causing trouble in the match against Hanoi in the 6th round of the V.League. In the second leg of that season, a "rain" of flares and a series of water bottles were thrown at My Dinh Stadium (due to the renovation of Hang Day Stadium). The VFF Disciplinary Committee has banned Hai Phong fans from going to the away field at the end of the first leg. In the 2018 season, Hai Phong club was fined a record of more than 300 million VND by the VFF disciplinary committee because fans set off flares. However, by the 6th round of V.League 2019, a huge amount of flares continued to be burned. Mr. Tran Anh Tu - chairman of the board of directors and General Director of VPF said that the match between Hanoi and Hai Phong was the match with "the most firecrackers ever" that he witnessed. And Mr. Vu Xuan Thanh - Head of the VFF Disciplinary Committee said that there must be boxes of flares brought into the stadium by Hai Phong fans.
In more than 10 years of confrontation in V.League, Hai Phong vs Hanoi FC are both have scored 63 goals each. Striker Hoang Vu Samson of Hanoi FC is the highest scorer with 12 goals.
The tense nature of each confrontation has turned the "Northern Derby" match into an indispensable spice of the V-League, this is a rare true derby of the national championship.

Hoang Anh Gia Lai

In the 21st century, Hoang Anh Gia Lai and Hanoi are widely the most supported clubs in Vietnam, so the confrontation between the two clubs is dubbed the "Vietnamese Super Derby". From 2009 to 2020, They met totally 27 times in all competitions, Hanoi overwhelmed with 14 wins, 6 draws, 7 losses. But the great battle between the two teams only started to get attention from 2018, when U23 Vietnam won runner-up in 2018 AFC U-23 Championship with almost players who are playing for both of these teams. Since then, the matches with Hoang Anh Gia Lai have always been the focus of the media when the competition between the two teams is not only the happenings on the field but also the philosophy of football development and management, even their owners are Đỗ Quang Hiển and Đoàn Nguyên Đức. Flares and bottle-throwing scenes have appeared in the match between the two teams. Hot heads not only appeared among players and fans, but once spread to the coaching staff. Due to the tense nature of the match, many times the referee's decisions were controversial, affecting the situation and the outcome of the match.

Viettel
Viettel and Hanoi are the same local football club based in Hanoi. With the relive and rising of Red Tornado, Hanoi Derby in 2020 was tension with 2 red cards for both team. They have met each other 16 times in their history, Hanoi dominating Viettel with 10 wins, 4 draws and 2 losses.

Nam Dinh

Nam Dinh fans began to follow Hai Phong's footsteps and set off flares at Hang Day yard to take revenge on Hanoi. The culmination was in round 22 of the V-League 2019, in the second half of the match between Hanoi and Nam Dinh, a flare from stand B of Nam Dinh fans rushed towards stand A, making the crowd unable to dodge. A female fan named Huyen Anh was unfortunately hit by a cannon in her thigh, she suffered a severe sulfur burn, it affected the bone, so she will definitely need surgery. This incident has stirred up the Vietnamese online community, angry at the extreme action of a part of Nam Dinh fans. Dong Da district police have prosecuted the case and summoned 14 Nam Dinh fans. Chairman of the Hanoi People's Committee Nguyen Duc Chung directed the City Police to focus on investigating, clarifying and strictly handling the person who caused the incident. On the BTC side, it has issued a heavy penalty to the parties involved after the above incident. Hanoi was fined 85 million dong for failing to ensure match security. Nam Dinh was also fined 85 million VND, of which 70 million VND for the error of letting fans light flares, 15 million VND for throwing strange objects on the field. In this match, Hanoi beat Nam Dinh 6–1.

Others
Song Lam Nghe An is always a difficult opponent to play even with the former Hanoi T&T and the current Hanoi Club. The fights are always tense, even violent. The results are often mixed. Similar to matches with Hai Phong Club, the match is always hot both on the field and in the stands. It was Song Lam Nghe An who ended the 32 match unbeaten streak at home on the very occasion of the Hanoi club's birthday.

The rivalry with Becamex Binh Duong FC is always tense in the seasons. The matches are often very dramatic. The two teams have also won many times at each other's home ground. At its peak, Becamex Binh Duong was the only team capable of surpassing Hanoi to win the championship for 2 consecutive years despite "only one team".

Controversy

One owner,many teams
A multi-team boss is the most controversial issue related to the purple shirt team. On July 5, 2019, Mr. Đoan Nguyen Duc, Chairman of Hoang Anh Gia Lai commented on the status of a boss of many teams in the V.League. When Ho Chi Minh City FC was leading the league, talking about their championship opportunity this season, elected Duc said: "I always affirm that Ho Chi Minh City FC cannot win the V.League this year, because they are a team, how to confront 5 teams. If 5 sick guys beat a fat guy, how can the fat guy stand it?' Mr. Duc's statement reminded him of Mr. Do Quang Hien, who is currently the boss and special sponsor of 7 clubs in the V.League 1 and V.League 2. Earlier in 2018, Mr. Doan Nguyen Duc also said that the status of a boss of many teams will reduce the motivation to invest in Vietnamese football. Public opinion in 10 years from 2009 Until 2019, only two consecutive championships in 2018 and 2019 is the purple shirt team showing clear strength, thanks to the national team that sometimes reaches 10 people; the remaining championships all have "marks". of the score relationship between the purple shirt team - SHB Da Nang - Quang Nam FC- Saigon FC (which are the clubs of Mr. Hien) and Than Quang Ninh who also being heavily funded by Mr.Hien. However, the story of a multi-team boss is also controversial in two years. 2018 and 2019 with the statements of coach Nguyen Van Sy of Nam Dinh FC, elected Duc of Hoang Anh Gia Lai, coach Chung Hae-song of Ho Chi Minh City Club or manager Trinh Van Quyet of FLC Thanh Hoa. Mr. Quyet declared: "If FLC Thanh Hoa is only one team, it certainly can't win the championship". Coach Le Thuy Hai, who has won the championship 3 times with Becamex Binh Duong, said: "A boss who owns two teams has made the teams work hard in the race to the championship or relegation.Even if there are four teams, many teams also want to invest and are determined to win the V.League, but seeing the situation of a boss of four teams (although it is not clear) also hesitated…”.Season The 2022 tournament also encountered a scandal when the Organizing Committee had to issue a warning about some teams giving up points to each other. After the 0-3 loss against the purple shirt team in the second leg of the 2022 season, Hien went down to encourage and join the team. shouting determination to stay relegation with the teachers and students of SHB Da Nang. There is a stream of opinion that, the 2022 V.League 1 championship of the purple shirt team is also partly from the referee's rulings in favor of the purple shirt team.

Raw gameplay and bad visuals

Although the purple shirt team always tries to build a friendly team image, the happenings on the field do not show that. The frequency of rough hitting the purple shirt players increased when they did not get the desired results.

Right in the first season to attend V.league (2009), the purple shirt team was disciplined when there was a clash with Vissai Ninh Binh. The following season (2010), the act of bowing to the referee caused Le Cong Vinh to be suspended for 6 matches and pay a fine of 10 million VND. In the 2012 season, after receiving a yellow card for knocking his knee into Van Nhien's back (Hoang Anh Gia Lai), Nguyen Quoc Long bowed to the referee, causing the defender of Hanoi T&T to be suspended for 3 matches. Quoc Long then continued to be suspended for 5 matches and fined 20 million VND for his unsportsmanlike behavior, insulting reporters working on the field during the match against Xuan Thanh Saigon Cement at the 2012 Vietnamese Cup. On the same day, Van Quyet was suspended for 2 matches, goalkeeper Pham Ngoc Tu was fined 15 million VND, suspended for the next 4 matches, goalkeeper coach Tran Tien Anh of Hanoi T&T club was also fined 5 million VND. , was banned from directing 2 matches at the 2013 Vietnam Finals because of a reaction error. In this season, there was another creepy situation when Samson of Hanoi T&T "lowered the bottom of his shoe" in Huy Hoang's face to retaliate for the act that made the Nghe An central defender unconscious on the field. In the 2013 season, Cao Sy Cuong had to receive a red card for rushing straight into Le Hoang Thien (HAGL). After that, Quoc Long got up, used many offensive words and rushed to "live the roof" with the referee, leading to a two-match suspension and a fine of 5 million VND. The following season, Hoang Vu Samson fought on the field with 3 Hai Phong players. In the framework of the Super Cup match of the same year, assistant Van Sy Son threatened to punch referee Dinh Van Dung "swishing the whistle in his mouth", and Hien also went down to the field to curse and slap this referee and his colleagues. partner. In the 2015 season, the purple shirt defense clashed with HAGL players while Duong Thanh Hao caused Abass (Binh Duong) to break his leg in the 2015 National Cup final.

In the 2016 season after changing his name, Van Quyet pushed the referee in the match against Sanna Khanh Hoa, causing this player to be suspended for 5 matches, fined 15 million VND and not called up to the national team. The next season, Hoang Vu Samson caused outrage when he dropped the ball and kicked Chau Ngoc Quang's knee (HAGL). In the 2-6 defeat to Ceres Negros in the AFC Cup, this player also punched two opposing players. In addition, Sam Ngoc Duc had a dangerous cut with both feet, hitting Nguyen Anh Hung's right foot (Haiphong FC).

Entering the peak period from the 2018 season, the image of head coach Chu Dinh Nghiem hot-tempered, rushing into the field to "lose" with referee Ngo Duy Lan after the "black shirt king" disqualified captain Pham Thanh from playing. Luong also because of the error of insulting the referee made many people think that the purple shirt team had seriously damaged their reputation in the public eye. The following season, coach Chu Dinh Nghiem again insulted the referee and was banned from directing for 2 matches. In the 2020 season, the image of the players and coaching staff of the purple shirt team being surrounded, uncultured reactions, uncivilized actions with the referee team continued to make the club lose points in the eyes of the fans.

Statistics show that after the first 8 rounds of the 2021 season, the purple team received 16 yellow cards, 1 red card and 2 cold cards for rough play. The next season, Duy Manh showed an ugly game with two situations of giving up the ball to striker Rafaelson (Topenland Binh Dinh) within 16.50m and an elbow loop that made Jermie Lynch (Binh Dinh) give up . In the Vietnam Super Cup match 2023, Duy Manh also stepped on Viet Hung's head.

Honours

National competitions

League
V.League 1
 Winners (6; record) : 2010, 2013, 2016, 2018, 2019, 2022
 Runners-up (5): 2011, 2012, 2014, 2015, 2020
V.League 2
 Runners-up (1): 2008
Second League
 Runners-up (1): 2007
Third League
 Winners (1) : 2006

Cup
Vietnamese National Cup
 Winners (3) : 2019, 2020, 2022
 Runners-up (3): 2012, 2015, 2016
Vietnamese Super Cup
 Winners (5) : 2010, 2018, 2019, 2020, 2022
 Runners-up (3) : 2013, 2015, 2016

Other
Labor Order 3rd class: 2019

Continental record
All results (home and away) list Hanoi's goal tally first.

Season-by-season record

Current squad

Other players under contract

Out on loan

Reserves and academy

Club officials

Managerial history
Head coaches by years (2006–present)

References

External links
Official website
V.League profile
Soccerway profile

Hanoi FC
Football clubs in Vietnam
Football clubs in Hanoi
Association football clubs established in 2006
2006 establishments in Vietnam